Reset is a 2014 South Korean television series starring Chun Jung-myung and Kim So-hyun. It aired on OCN from August 24 to October 26, 2014 on Sundays at 23:00 for 10 episodes.

Plot
Cha Woo-jin's first love, Seung-hee, was murdered 15 years ago. Obsessed with finding her killer, Woo-jin became a prosecutor and has since devoted his career to putting violent criminals behind bars. With ten days left before the statute of limitations on Seung-hee's case runs out, Woo-jin meets a 17-year-old high school girl named Jo Eun-bi who looks exactly like Seung-hee. Their meeting catalyzes a chain of events that lead Woo-jin nearer to uncovering the truth about the original crime, but Eun Bi's involvement in the investigation makes her the killer's new target.

Cast
Chun Jung-myung as Cha Woo-jin
Kim So-hyun as Jo Eun-bi / Choi Seung-hee
Park Won-sang as Investigator Go
Shin Eun-jung as Section chief Han
Song Ha-yoon as Choi Yoon-hee
Kim Hak-chul as GK Group chairman Kim
Choi Jae-woong as Prosecutor Kim Dong-soo
Jung Kyu-soo as Chief prosecutor
Choi Soo-han as young Cha Woo-jin
Choi Hyo-eun as Miss Jang
Yeom Ji-young as Journalist Lee Young-na
Kim Min-jae as Detective Park
Lee Yeon as Chairman Kim's secretary
Yoon Park as Kim In-seok
Yang Hak-jin as One of the men in the CCTV room
Shin Cheol-jin as Mr.Oh	
Kim Jin-yi as Han Mi-seon
Kim Young-jae as Psychiatrist
 Song Tae-yoon
 Kang Ki-young as Section Chief

Ratings

Note: This drama airs on cable channel / pay TV which has a relatively small audience compared to free-to-air TV / public broadcasters (KBS, MBC, SBS, and EBS).

References

External links
 

OCN television dramas
2014 South Korean television series debuts
2014 South Korean television series endings
South Korean crime television series
South Korean thriller television series
Fiction about hypnosis
Television series about prosecutors